Florian Sturm (born 6 May 1982, in Wörgl, Tyrol) is an Austrian footballer.

Club career
He started his career at Tirol, and went to WSG Wattens of 1st League for their campaign to avoid relegation. He then played one season at SW Bregenz before joining SK Rapid Wien. He signed a contract extension until summer 2005 in April 2004.

In the summer of 2008 Sturm played on trial for Milton Keynes Dons, scoring a goal in a 4-1 friendly defeat to Sheffield Wednesday F.C. He has since signed for them on a free transfer becoming Roberto Di Matteo's first signing. However, after several months plagued by injury and only a handful of league games, his contract was mutually terminated.

Honours
 Austrian Football Bundesliga: 2005

References

External links
Player profile - MK Dons
Rapid stats - Rapid Archive
Stats - Soccerbase

1982 births
Living people
People from Kufstein District
Austrian footballers
Association football midfielders
FC Tirol Innsbruck players
SW Bregenz players
SK Rapid Wien players
SpVgg Greuther Fürth players
FC Vaduz players
Austrian expatriate footballers
Austrian expatriate sportspeople in Liechtenstein
Milton Keynes Dons F.C. players
First Vienna FC players
Austrian Football Bundesliga players
Expatriate footballers in Germany
Expatriate footballers in England
Expatriate footballers in Liechtenstein
Footballers from Tyrol (state)
WSG Tirol players
FC Wacker Innsbruck (2002) players
Austrian expatriate sportspeople in England
Austrian expatriate sportspeople in Germany